Zsuzsanna Lovász (formerly Zsuzsanna Pavlikné Lovász; born 17 December 1976, in Budapest) is a retired Hungarian handball player. She participated at the 2004 Summer Olympics, where she placed fifth with the Hungarian national team.

Personal life 
Her husband is János Dénes, Hungarian handballer. Their daughter Panna, was born in 2012.

Achievements
Nemzeti Bajnokság I:
Winner: 2004
Silver Medalist: 2005, 2008
Bronze Medalist: 2001, 2002, 2003, 2006, 2007
Magyar Kupa:
Winner: 2004
Silver Medalist: 2008
Bronze Medalist: 2007
EHF Cup:
Finalist: 2002
World Championship:
Silver Medalist: 2003
European Championship:
Bronze Medalist: 2004

References

External links
 Career statistics on Worldhandball.com
 Profile on Handball.hu

1976 births
Living people
Győri Audi ETO KC players
Handball players at the 2004 Summer Olympics
Hungarian female handball players
Olympic handball players of Hungary
Handball players from Budapest
20th-century Hungarian women
21st-century Hungarian women